The Lyttelton by-election of 1913 was a by-election during the 18th New Zealand Parliament. As no candidate won an absolute majority on the first ballot on 9 December, a second round was held on 16 December. The seat had become vacant due to the death of sitting MP George Laurenson. Five candidates stood. It was the last by-election in New Zealand to use the Two-round voting system to elect a member.

Results
The following tables give the election results:

First ballot

The two highest candidates were McCombs and Miller, so they contested the second ballot.

Second ballot

References

Lyttelton 1913
1913 elections in New Zealand
Politics of Christchurch
1910s in Christchurch
History of Christchurch
Lyttelton, New Zealand